The 1925 Baylor Bears football team was an American football team that represented Baylor University in the Southwest Conference (SWC) during the 1925 college football season. In its sixth and final season under head coach Frank Bridges, the team compiled a 3–5–2 record (0–3–2 against conference opponents), finished in last place in the conference, and was outscored by a total of 115 to 79. The team played its home games at the Cotton Palace in Waco, Texas. Homer D. Walker was the team captain.

Schedule

References

Baylor
Baylor Bears football seasons
Baylor Bears football